The Tender, the Moving, the Swinging Aretha Franklin is the third studio album by American singer Aretha Franklin, released in 1962 by Columbia Records. It was her first album to achieve any commercial success, reaching number 69 on the Billboard pop album charts. Unlike its predecessor, however, it did not have a hit single. The album was recorded at Columbia Recording Studio, in New York City.

Track listing

Side One
 "Don't Cry, Baby" (Saul Bernie, James P. Johnson, Stella Unger) – 3:23
 "Try a Little Tenderness" (James Campbell and Reginald Connelly, Harry M. Woods) – 3:16
 "I Apologize" (Al Hoffman, Al Goodhart, Ed Nelson) – 2:53
 "Without the One You Love" (Aretha Franklin) – 2:48
 "Look for the Silver Lining" (Jerome Kern, B. G. DeSylva) – 3:04
 "I'm Sitting on Top of the World" (Ray Henderson, Sam M. Lewis, Joe Young) – 2:42

Side Two
 "Just for a Thrill" (Lil Hardin Armstrong, Don Raye) 2:33
 "God Bless the Child" (Billie Holiday, Arthur Herzog, Jr.) – 3:03
 "I'm Wandering" (Berry Gordy, Jr., Tyran Carlo) – 3:27
 "How Deep Is the Ocean" (Irving Berlin) – 2:48
 "I Don't Know You Anymore" (Gary Geld, Peter Udell) – 2:50
 "Lover Come Back to Me" (Sigmund Romberg, Oscar Hammerstein II) – 2:35

Mono Mixes
Bonus tracks on reissue

 "Trouble In Mind" (Richard M. Jones) – 2:15
 "Without the One You Love" – 2:46
 "Don't Cry, Baby" – 3:14
 "I'm Wandering" – 3:25
 "Try a Little Tenderness" – 3:14
 "I Apologize" – 2:52
 "Lover Come Back to Me" – 2:34
 "I Don't Know You Anymore" – 2:47

Personnel 
Aretha Franklin – vocals, piano
Robert Mersey – producer, personal supervisor, arrangements, conductor
Don Hunstein – cover photography

Charts

References

Aretha Franklin albums
1962 albums
Columbia Records albums